Santarsiero is a surname. Notable people with this surname include:

 Danilo Santarsiero (born 1979), Italian bobsledder
 Steve Santarsiero, American politician
 Vito Santarsiero (born 1955), Italian politician

Italian-language surnames